The Sultanate of Maguindanao (Maguindanaon: Kasultanan nu Magindanaw, كاسولتانن نو ماڬينداناو; Jawi: کسلطانن ماڬيندناو; Iranun: Kesultanan a Magindanao;) was a sultanate that ruled parts of the island of Mindanao, in the southern Philippines, especially in modern-day Maguindanao provinces (Maguindanao del Sur and Maguindanao del Norte), Soccsksargen, Zamboanga Peninsula and Davao Region. Its known historical influence stretches from the peninsula of Zamboanga to the bay of Sarangani. During the era of European colonization, the Sultanate maintained friendly relations with British and Dutch traders.

History

Before the founding of the Sultanate of Maguindanao, according to the Yuan Dynasty annals, Nanhai Zhi (At year 1304), a polity known as Wenduling 文杜陵 was its predecessor-state. This Wenduling was invaded by then Hindu Brunei, called Pon-i (present-day Sultanate of Brunei), until it rebelled against Pon-i after the Majapahit Empire's invasion of Pon-i. Islamization then happened afterwards. Firstly, two brothers named Mamalu and Tabunaway lived peacefully in the Cotabato Valley on Mindanao and then Shariff Mohammed Kabungsuwan of Johor in what is now modern day Malaysia, preached Islam in the area in the 16th century, Tabunaway converted, while Mamalu decided to hold fast to their ancestral animist beliefs. The brothers parted ways, with Tabunaway heading to the lowlands and Mamalu to the mountains, but they vowed to honor their kinship, and thus an unwritten pact of peace between Maguindanaons and the indigenous peoples was forged through the two brothers.

As Shariff Kabungsuwan introduced Islam in the area, which was earlier Hindu-influenced from Srivijaya times, at the end of the 16th century and established himself as Sultan seated in Malabang-Lanao. He exiled some of his people who apostatised to Cotabato. He subsequently married into the families of local chieftains and established the Sultanate of Maguindanao, with its seat in Slangan (the western part of present-day Cotabato), making him virtually Sultan of the whole island. The sultanate was usually centered in the Cotabato Valley.

Asraf Mohamad Samalan Dipatuan Qudratullah Fahar'uddin Nasiruddin, popularly known as Kudarat and whose name as a youth was Ullah Untong, was one of the greatest sultans who controlled Mindanao. In his island sanctuary in Sulu, he was known as Sultan Nasiruddin and after his reign was buried there. His grandson Abd al-Rahman continued increasing the Sultanate's power and influence.

The Maguindanao Sultanate also had a close alliance with the Ternate Sultanate, a sultanate in the Moluccas region of Indonesia. Ternate regularly sent military reinforcements to Maguindanao during the Spanish-Moro Wars.

Nevertheless, its power was reduced when the Confederate Sultanates of Lanao, declared independence from the Maguindanao Sultanate.

During the Spanish colonial period, the Sultanate of Maguindanao was able to defend its territory, preventing the Spaniards from colonising the entire Mindanao and ceding the island of Palawan to the Spanish government in 1705. The island priory ceded to him by Sulu Sultan Sahabuddin. This was to have help dissuaded Spanish encroachments into the island of Maguindanao and Sulu itself.

Chinese gongs, yellow as a color of royalty, and idioms of Chinese origin entered Mindanao culture. Royalty was connected to yellow. The color yellow was used by the Sultan in Mindanao. Chinese tableware and gongs were exported to the Moros.

Merchant Chinese were tranquilly residing alongside the Moros in Maguindanao.

List of Sultans of Maguindanao
Historical records document 24 Sultans of Maguindanao.

1. Sharif Muhammad Kabungsuwan

According to some tradition of the Tarsilan as by decoded Dr. Sleeby and Dr. Majul, Sharif Ali Kabungsuwan was the son of Sharif Abu'Bkr-Zein Ul-Abidin, uncle of Sulu Sultan Sharif Ul-Hashim. Their ancestor, Sultan Betatar of Taif (present-day Saudi Arabia) was the ninth-generation descendant of Hassan ibn Ali, the son of Fatimah, daughter of the Prophet Muhammad. Sharif Kabungsuwan settled in Malabang Lanao, and met the brothers Tabunaway and Mamalu in Inawan. He converted the natives at Bpayguan but Mamalu and the native tribes he led opted not to convert and returned to their uphill homeland in Mindanao (Saleeby). Kabungsuwan's mother was of the Johore Royal Family at the southernmost tip of the Malay Peninsula. It may be speculated that he arrived on the shores of Mindanao around 1515. He was the second Makdum (Karim Ul-Makdum) who had come and reinforced Islam. He married the daughter of Tomoai Aliwya of the Maguindanao Family Dynasty. After his father in-law's death, the latter's political authority fell on Kabungsuwan who had established the Sultanate of Maguindanao as its first Sultan, reigning as Sultan Aliwya. Shariff Kabunsuan was given the authority and power to lead by Rajah Tabunaway and Apo Mamalu, the son of Shariff Maradja from Johor. Rajah Tabunaway was the one who accept Kabungsuwan at the Pulangi River.

2. Sharif Maka-alangHe was a son of Muhammad Kabungsuwan and surnamed “Saripada”. His mother Angintabu was a daughter of an Iranun chief from the area now known as Malabang. In 1543, during the Villalobos expedition, some Spaniards were able to reach the mouth of the Pulangi where they were informed by the inhabitants that the chief was called “Sarriparra”. This being a variation of “salipada” or “saripada”, it can be surmised that the chief was the Sharif Maka-alang; especially if it is considered that not only does a Tarsila explicitly state that the Sharif had such a title but that such a title was not found among his immediate successors.

3. Datu BangkayaHe was a son of Sharif Maka-alang. In 1574, Guido de Lavezaris wrote to the Spanish King that the chief of Mindanao River wanted to become a friend of the Spaniards. In another Spanish report dated 1579, this chief is referred to as “Asulutan” (Arabic, As-sulutan) with the information that he was a father of Diman Sankay and that he had already died. This refers probably to Datu Bangkaya who by 1574 must have been reigning for some time, since in 1579, his son Dimansankay, was considered by the Spaniards to have been “an old man”. Datu Bangkaya could also have been the ruler in the Pulangi who was reported to have died in 1578.

4. Datu Dimasankay

He was a son of Bangkaya. Spanish reports say that he was ruling in 1579 and that he was an old man. The leading datus of the Iranuns and Maranaos all claim descent from him.

5. Datu SalikulaHe was the half-brother of Dimansankay and also known as Gugu Salikula. Up to early 1597, he appeared to be a lading chief of Maguindanao, Dimansankay being dead at that time. According to tarsilas, he married a Sulu princess, and therefore he might have been the Maguindanao chief seen in Jolo in 1597 where he was supposed to have been banished for being “restless and rebellious” and who was further described as a brother-in-law of the Sulu ruler and an uncle of the Maguindanao Rajah Muda (erroneously called “King”) by the Spaniards. He was chief around 1585 to 1597.

6. Kapitan Laut Buisan

He was a younger half-brother of both Dimansankay and Salikula; he was sometimes called by the title “Katchil”. His rule began around 1597 when he displaced Salikula; he controlled his nephew, the Rajah Muda, a son of Dimansankay. He must have been chief at least up to 1619, since Dutch sources mention relations with the immediate predecessor of Kudarat at this date.

7. Sultan Kudarat

A son of Buisan, he was known to the Spaniards as "Corralat" and to some Dutch writers as "Guserat". In 1619–1621, there was war between Buayan and Maguindanao, probably dynastic or a contest for primacy in the Pulangi. Kudarat must have been involved in this war for not long after a temporary reversal he appears as exercising some political power over Buayan. Furthermore, he must have consolidated his power well enough after this to enable him to attack Sarangani in 1625. He died about the end of 1671 after having ruled about half a century. His rule, with varying fortunes and at different capitals can, therefore, be fairly estimated to have taken place from 1619 to 1671. By 1645, he was already using the title of “sultan”. As a young man he was entitled “Katchil”. His great-grandchildren referred to him as Nasir ud-Din.

8. Sultan Dundang TidulayHe was a son of Kudarat and there is a report that he died before his father. If he ruled at all, it must have been for a very short time. He was referred to as Saif ud-Din by his grandchildren.

9. Sultan Barahaman (Arabic, ‘Abd ur-Rahman) 
He was a son of Sultan Tidulay. He was also known as Minulu sa Rahmatullah. His sons referred to him as Muhammad Shah. He was Almo Sobat (Arabic, Al Mu-Thabbat) to William Dampier or the Almo al-Lasab Brahaman to the Spaniards. He also used the name of his grandfather, Kudarat. He was reported as sultan early as 1678. Information given to Dutch officials at Ternate was that he died on July 6, 1699.

10. Sultan Kahar Ud-din KudaHe was a younger brother of Barahaman and was sometimes known as Jamal ul-‘Azam. He also assumed the title of Amir ul-‘Umara as well as that of Maulana. His reign was contested by two of his nephews, the sons of Barahaman. To make more secure his authority, he asked the aid of the Sulu Sultan Shahab ud-Din who came over to Simuay where Kuda held court. A misunderstanding as well as bitterness due to a long standing feud brought about a pitched battle between the Sulus and Maguindanaos. In the struggle, the Sulu Sultan personally slew Kuda. This event took place on August 10, 1702.

11. Sultan Bayan Ul-AnwarHis other regnal name was Jalal ud-Din. Entitled Dipatuan during his lifetime, he was known after his death as Mupat Batua. He was a son of Sultan Barahaman. In 1701, he was already intriguing against his uncle, the Sultan. He succeeded to the throne in 1702 and held court in Slangan but was often in Sibugay. His younger brother Ja’far Sadiq, the Rajah Muda, revolted against him but managed to keep the throne. In 1736, Anwar abdicated in favor of his son, Tahir ud- Din Malinug (no. 13). He died around 1745.

12. Sultan Muhammad Ja’far Sadiq ManamirHe was a younger brother of Sultan Bayan ul-Anwar. He was sometimes referred to as Amir ud-Din. Referred to as Maulana while alive, he was known after his death as Shahid Mupat. He contested the reign of his older brother, but he was forced to flee to Tamontaka in 1710. Dutch officials referred to him as “the young king” to distinguish him from Sultan Bayan ul Anwar. By 1725 he had assumed the title of Paduka Sri Sultan. In March 1733, his brother and nephew Malinug attacked his forces in Tamontaka. The latter caused his death in the ensuing struggle. While his brother had power along the coast, Manamir held sway over the interior. His power was recognized in Tamontaka from about 1710 to his death in March 1733.

13. Sultan Muhammad Tahir Ud-dinA son of Sultan Bayan ul-Anwar, he was commonly known to the Spaniards as "Dipatuan Malinug". He was also known as Muhammad Shah Amir ud-Din. In a battle in 1733, he killed his uncle Ja’far Sadiq Manamir. In 1736, his father started sharing with him the responsibilities of government. His authority was however contested by two of his cousins, sons of Manamir, forcing him to retire to the interior where he died in Buayan around 1748.

14. Sultan Muhammad Khair Ud-dinHe was a son of Sultan Ja’far Sadiq and was better known to Europeans as "Pakir Maulana Kamsa" (Arabic, Faqir Maulana Hamzah) or Amir ud-Din Hamza. He also used the name ‘Azim ud-Din and assumed the title Amir al-Mu'minin ("Commander of the Faithful"). In 1733, after his father was slain, he began to consider himself heir to the throne and thereupon styled himself the Rajah Muda. The next year, he was formally invested with the duties of a sultan in the presence of the Spanish officials from Zamboanga. With some Spanish aid, he was able to consolidate his position in Tamontaka and contest the rule of his uncle Bayan ul-Anwar and later that of his cousin Malinug. But upon the latter's death around 1748, the struggle for the sultanate ceased. Pakir Maulana Kamsa emerged as paramount chief of Maguindanao. Around 1755, he started to relinquish some of his powers to his younger brother with the condition that his son, Kibad Sahriyal, would be the Rajah Muda.

15. Sultan Pahar Ud-dinHe was a younger brother of Pakir Maulan Kamsa and was known as Datu Pongloc or Panglu. He began to exercise the powers of sultan around 1755 and was in the sultan's seat in that same year when Captain Thomas Forrest paid a visit to Maguindanao. He was posthumously known as Mupat Hidayat.

16. Sultan Kibad SahriyalHis more regal title was Muhammad ‘Azim ud-Din Amir ul-Umara. He was a son of Pakir Maulana Kamsa. Even before the death of his uncle the Sultan, he was already being addressed as “sultan”. He was friendly towards the Spaniards and at least twice entered into peaceful negotiations with them, namely, in 1780 and 1794. He probably governed from 1780 to 1805.

17. Sultan Kawasa Anwar Ud-dinHe was a son of Kibad Sahriyal and like his father was also entitled Amir ul-‘Umara. He entered into a peace treaty with the Spaniards in 1805. One of his seals carried the title of Iskandar Julkarnain. He possibly reigned from 1805 to 1830.

18. Sultan Iskandar Qudraullah Muhammad Zamal Ul-AzamHe was more popularly known as Sultan Untong. He was a grandson of Kibad Sahriyal and a nephew of Sultan Kawasa. Some Spanish documents carry his name as Iskandar Qudarat Pahar-ud-Din. In 1837 and 1845, he entered into friendly treaties with the Spaniards. He died either in 1853 and 1854.

19. Sultan Muhammad MakakwaHe was a grandson of Sultan Kawasa Anwar ud-Din. His rule can be estimated to have lasted from about 1854 to 1884. He died in Nuling (in the site of the old settlement of Maguindanao).

20. Sultan Mohammad Jalal Ud-din PabluAlso known as Sultan Wata, he was a son of Sultan Makakwa. His capital was at Banubu, just opposite the town of Cotabato across the Pulangi. His death took place in 1888.

21. Sultan MangiginHe was a grandson of the famous Datu Dakula of Sibugay, who in turn, was a grandson of Kibad Sahriyal (No. 16). He began his rule in 1896. From 1888 to 1896, the Sultanate experienced an interregnum, possibly because Datu Utto (Sultan Anwar ud-Din of Buayan) wanted his brother-in-law Datu Mamaku (a son of Sultan Qudratullah Untong) to become Sultan. The Spaniards, however, wanted the sultanate to go to one of the Sibugay datus. Around the end of 1900, Sultan Mangigin transferred his residence from Cotabato to Sibugay. In 1906, he married Rajah Putri, the widow of Datu Utto and sister of Datu Mamaku.

22. Sultan Muhammad Hijaban Iskandar Mastura KudaratHe acceded the throne upon Mangigin's death in 1926. By this time, the Sultanate assumed a more ceremonial, traditional character. It continued to be the central institution for traditional and religious affairs of the Maguindanao and Iranun peoples.

Pretenders
As of May 2018, there are three major royal families in Maguindanao. Each having an enthroned sultan under the Sultanate of Maguindanao, Kingdom of Rajah Buayan, and Domain of Allah Valley.

See also
 List of Sunni Muslim dynasties
 Johor Sultanate
 Sultanate of Sulu

References

External links
Laarhoven, Ruurdje. "WE ARE MANY NATIONS: THE EMERGENCE OF A MULTI-ETHNIC MAGUINDANAO SULTANATE." Philippine Quarterly of Culture and Society 14, no. 1 (1986): 32–53. WE ARE MANY NATIONS: THE EMERGENCE OF A MULTI-ETHNIC MAGUINDANAO SULTANATE.

http://nlpdl.nlp.gov.ph:81/CC01/NLP00VM052mcd/v1/v31.pdf

History of Mindanao
Former countries in Philippine history
Maguindanao
Muslim dynasties
History of Maguindanao del Norte
History of Maguindanao del Sur
Moro people
Filipino royalty
History of the Philippines (900–1565)
History of the Philippines (1565–1898)
States and territories established in 1508
States and territories disestablished in 1888
1508 establishments in the Philippines
1888 disestablishments in the Philippines
1508 establishments in Asia
1888 disestablishments in Asia
Maritime Southeast Asia
Former countries in Indonesian history
Former countries